The 1997 Golden Globes (Portugal) were the second edition of the Golden Globes (Portugal).

Winners

Cinema:
Best Film: Cinco Dias, Cinco Noites, with José Fonseca e Costa
Best Director: Manoel de Oliveira, in Party
Best Actress: Inês de Medeiros, in Pandora
Best Actor: Diogo Infante, in Mortinho por chegar a casa

Sports:
Personality of the Year: Fernanda Ribeiro

Fashion:
Personality of the Year: José Carlos

Theatre:
Personality of the Year: Paulo Pires

Music:
Best Performer: Luís Represas
Best Group: Delfins
Best Song: Se eu fosse um dia o teu olhar - Pedro Abrunhosa

Television:
Best Information Host: José Rodrigues dos Santos
Best Entertainment Host: Herman José
Best Fiction and Comedy Show: Contra Informação
Best Entertainment Show: Herman Total
Best Information Program: Maria Elisa

Career Award:
Mário Soares

References

1996 film awards
1996 music awards
1996 television awards
Golden Globes (Portugal)
1997 in Portugal